The 2008 Golden Globes (Portugal) were the 13th edition of the Golden Globes (Portugal).

Winners and nominees

Cinema:
Best Film:   Call Girl with António Pedro Vasconcelos
Best Actor:   Ivo Canelas
Best Actress:  Soraia Chaves (Call Girl, by António Pedro Vasconcelos)
Theatre:
Best Play:   Tragédia de Júlio César with Luís Miguel Cintra
Best Actress: Beatriz Batarda
Best Actor:  Diogo Infante in Hamlet
Fashion:
Best Stylist:         Filipe Faísca
Best Male Model:  Isaac Alfaiate
Best Female Model:   Alice
Music:
Best Individual Performer: Jorge Palma
Best Group: Da Weasel
Super Artist: Mundo Cão
Sport:
Best Sportsperson: Vanessa Fernandes
Best Coach:    Jesualdo Ferreira
Best Football Player:  Cristiano Ronaldo
Award of Merit and Excellence:
 Eunice Muñoz

References

2007 film awards
2007 music awards
2007 television awards
Golden Globes (Portugal)
2008 in Portugal